The 1917 All-Massillons football season  was their eighth season in existence. It would be their last season until 1919, since the Tigers 1918 season was cancelled due to the outbreak of World War I and the Spanish flu pandemic. 

The Tigers posted a 5–3 record in 1917.

Schedule

Game notes

References

Football Archives: 1917 Massillon Tigers

Massillon Tigers seasons
Massillon Tigers Season, 1917
1917 in sports in Ohio